Joseph-Philibert Girault de Prangey (21 October 1804 – 7 December 1892) was a French photographer and draughtsman who was active in the Middle East. His daguerreotypes are the earliest surviving photographs of Greece, Palestine, Egypt, Syria and Turkey. Remarkably, his photographs were only discovered in the 1920s in a storeroom of his estate and then only became known eighty years later.

Career
Girault de Prangey studied painting in Paris at the École des Beaux-Arts and in 1841 he learned daguerreotypy, possibly from Louis Daguerre himself or from Hippolyte Bayard. Girault de Prangey was keenly interested in the architecture of the Middle East, and he toured Italy and the countries of the eastern Mediterranean between 1841 and 1844, producing over 900 daguerreotypes of architectural views, landscapes, and portraits.

After his return to France, Girault de Prangey made watercolour and pen-and-ink studies after his photographs and published a small-edition book of lithographs from them. He also made stereographs of his estate and the exotic plants he collected. Girault de Prangey did not exhibit or otherwise make his photographs known during his lifetime.

Legacy
In May 2003, Sheikh Saud Al Thani of Qatar purchased a daguerreotype by Joseph-Philibert Girault de Prangey for a world-record price of £565,250 or $922,488.

On 30 January 2019, the Metropolitan Museum of Art opened "Monumental Journey: The Daguerreotypes of Girault de Prangey". Approximately 120 photographs that the amateur archaeologist created in Greece, Egypt, Syria, Turkey and the Levant during a self-financed tour of the region in the early 1840s were presented. They included the Parthenon in Athens, the Khayrbak Mosque in Cairo, and the Dome of the Rock in Jerusalem. Organized with the Bibliothèque Nationale de France in Paris, it was the first comprehensive exhibition in America devoted to the French artist.

References

External links
 Anglo-American Name Authority File, s.v. "Girault de Prangey", LC Control Number no 97045139. Accessed 31 January 2007.
 
 
 
 

 Joseph Philibert Girault de Prangey, Monuments arabes d'Egypte, de Syrie et d'Asie Mineure, dessinés et mesurés de 1842 à 1845. Uploaded to the Internet Archive 31 January 2018

1804 births
1892 deaths
People from Langres
Pioneers of photography
19th-century French photographers
Early photographers in Palestine
Photography in Turkey
French draughtsmen
École des Beaux-Arts alumni